Her Highness Dances the Waltz may refer to:

 Her Highness Dances the Waltz (1926 film), an Austrian silent romance film
 Her Highness Dances the Waltz (1935 film), a musical comedy film
 Hoheit tanzt Walzer (Her Highness Dances the Waltz), an operetta by Leo Asche